Jordan M. Lennerton (born February 16, 1986) is a Canadian former professional baseball first baseman. He had been in the Detroit Tigers' organization from the time he was drafted in 2008 until 2015.

Amateur career
Lennerton grew up in Langley, British Columbia, where he played Little League Baseball. His team reached the 1998 Little League World Series. Lennerton hit a home run in a game against a team from Japan. He attended Brookswood Secondary School and also played amateur baseball for the Langley Blaze of the British Columbia Premier Baseball League.

Lennerton attended El Paso Community College. He then transferred to Oregon State University, where he played for the Oregon State Beavers baseball team. He hit three home runs in the 2007 College World Series, which Oregon State won. In 2008, he was named to the All-Pacific-10 Conference team.

Professional career

Detroit Tigers
The Detroit Tigers drafted Lennerton in the 33rd round of the 2008 Major League Baseball draft. In 2012, while playing for the Erie SeaWolves, he was named to the Eastern League all-star game as well as being named Detroit Tigers organizational all star. Named top defensive first baseman in the Eastern League by Baseball America in 2012.

In 2013, Lennerton was assigned to the Toledo Mud Hens of the Class AAA International League. He represented the Tigers in the All-Star Futures Game.
He was also named an International League All-Star.

Lennerton was added to the Tigers 40-man roster on November 20, 2013, and was dropped on May 5, 2014. He cleared waivers and was assigned to Toledo. During the 2014 season, Lennerton batted .249 (102-for-410) with 26 doubles, 10 home runs, 53 RBIs, 73 walks and 114 strikeouts with the Toledo Mud Hens. On January 5, 2015, Lennerton signed a minor league contract with the Detroit Tigers. He was released on July 24, 2015.

Further career
Lennerton signed a minor league deal with the Atlanta Braves on July 27, 2015. He was released on March 21, 2016.

On April 10, 2016, Lennerton signed with the Quebec Capitales of the Can-Am League. He was released on April 6, 2017. He resigned on May 18, 2017. He was released on December 27, 2017.

He also played for the Leones de Ponce during the 2013 season in the Puerto Rico Baseball League. Lennerton (2014) played for the Cangrejeros de Santurce in the Puerto Rico Baseball League.

International career
Lennerton selected for the Canadian national baseball team in the 2013 World Baseball Classic Qualifier, 2013 World Baseball Classic, 2015 Pan American Games, 2015 WBSC Premier12, 2019 Pan American Games and 2019 WBSC Premier12.

References

External links

1986 births
Living people
Baseball first basemen
Baseball people from British Columbia
Baseball players at the 2015 Pan American Games
Baseball players at the 2019 Pan American Games
Canada national baseball team players
Canadian expatriate baseball players in the United States
Erie SeaWolves players
El Paso Tejanos baseball players
Gulf Coast Tigers players
Gwinnett Braves players
Lakeland Flying Tigers players
Leones de Ponce players
Canadian expatriate baseball players in Puerto Rico
Oregon State Beavers baseball players
Pan American Games gold medalists for Canada
Pan American Games medalists in baseball
Pan American Games silver medalists for Canada
People from Langley, British Columbia (city)
Québec Capitales players
Toledo Mud Hens players
West Michigan Whitecaps players
2015 WBSC Premier12 players
2019 WBSC Premier12 players
Medalists at the 2015 Pan American Games
Medalists at the 2019 Pan American Games